Naya Raipur, officially known as Atal Nagar-Nava Raipur, is a planned city and fully Greenfield city in Indian state of Chhattisgarh. It is planned to replace Raipur as the capital city of Chhattisgarh. The Government of Chhattisgarh, the state's administrative body is situated here. The city is located between National Highway 53 and National Highway 30, about 17 km south-east of the capital city Raipur. Swami Vivekananda Airport separates Raipur and Nava Raipur.

Nava Raipur Development Authority 
After the formation of the new state of Chhattisgarh in November 2000, the state government decided to create a well planned new city for Raipur. Hence a special area has been notified under section 64 of Nagar Tatha Gramnivesh Adhiniyam 1973.

The authority thus formed is the Capital Area Development Authority (CADA) which is now called the Atal Nagar Vikas Pradhikaran (NRDA). NRDA is the nodal agency undertaking comprehensive development of this 'greenfield' city.

Chief executive officers are appointed by government and other officers and staff working under NRDA organisation. Indian Administrative Service (IAS) officer P. Joy Oommen is the chairman of the NRDA, while Amit Kataria is its chief executive.

Economic base 

The main activity base of Naya Raipur would be the government/state capital functions. However, a diversification of economy is desirable, which would be attained through the following activities:
 Software technology park
 Gems, jewellery and other similar industries
 Business offices
 Health, education and research services
 Regional recreational activities
 Nandan Van Zoo & Safari
 International cricket stadium
 5 star hotels
 18 hole golf course and golf villas
 Museums
 Art gallery and library
 Garden
 Botanical garden
 Lakes

Planning methodology 

While venturing to prepare the development plan for Naya Raipur, basic studies were made in the form of a secondary survey of data on Chandigarh (the first planned capital of a state in independent India) and Raipur, the elder sister and the most important "organic" metropolis in the region.

The space quantum against each activity/work-centre was then ascertained going by the accepted thumb-rule of the concerned industry/trade/activity, to the case of capital complex, and exact figures of government jobs were taken into consideration. The resultant space quantum was then allocated on two-dimension on the structure plan and final quantum, shape, location, was defined by exact boundaries/roads on the plan.

With iterations, the allocated spaces were again translated in terms of number of jobs and the total number of job in the city arrived at. With a population of 5.6 lakhs, the Naya Raipur City will be expected to generate approximately 2.2 lakh jobs, with an assumed workforce participation rate of 40%. The high standards of physical and social infrastructure adopted for the city will be able to cope with the maximum capacity of the city.

Education 

Naya Raipur will form the hub of educational institutions in the state. The city will have premier educational institutions shifted from Raipur. A few of them are:
 Hidayatullah National Law University
 National Institute of Technology, Raipur 
 International Institute of Information Technology
 Indian Institute of Management, Raipur

Transportation

Roadways
Naya Raipur has an entirely planned road network within the city premises, and is having good connectivity with Raipur and the rest of the state, with the help of national and state highways. Some of the major roads are Raipur–Naya Raipur Expressway, or the Atal Path Expressway, which directly connects the city with Raipur railway station, National Highway 30 (NH-30 as a secondary highway to Raipur and National Highway 53 (NH-53), which passes through just north of the city. 

Once both the expressways are completed, it will help the city by enhancing connectivity and commute with the state, as well as with the rest of the country.

Rail
The major railway stations are Raipur Junction railway station,  and Arang Mahanadi railway station located at Arang,  from Naya Raipur, respectively.

To the east of the airport, in the Central Business District, a bypass line has been made to connect the city directly by making a new, major railway station for Naya Raipur. It is named as the CBD Railway Station, and is under construction. Once completed, it will become the main railway station for the city.

Bus transport

Regular bus services are operated by the Nava Raipur Atal Nagar Vikas Pradhikaran, government and private operators from the main bus station of Naya Raipur Bus Station, and along with these services, the Raipur and Naya Raipur Bus Rapid Transit System also connects the city with Raipur. The BRTS has currently 9 stops in the city, as part of the first phase of the smart city project, which in the future will be expanded in the coming phases.

Metro
A light rail, Metrolite or Lite Metro (as referred in India), has been proposed by the Government of Chhattisgarh, which will start from Naya Raipur to Durg via Raipur and Bhilai.

Air

The nearest airport is Swami Vivekananda Airport, the only major airport of Chhattisgarh, lies within the city premises of the city, in its western outskirts,  from the centre. The airport is well-connected, having daily direct flights to Mumbai, Delhi, Visakhapatnam, Kolkata, Bangalore, Pune, Chennai, Goa, Lucknow, Indore, Ahmedabad, Bhopal, Bhubaneswar, Hyderabad, Prayagraj, and Jagdalpur, operated by Alliance Air, IndiGo and Vistara airlines.

Sports 

Shaheed Veer Narayan Singh International Cricket Stadium is a recently constructed cricket stadium in the city. It was opened in 2008, and has a capacity to handle 65,000 spectators. It is the second largest cricket stadium in India and the fourth largest cricket stadium in the world by seating capacity.

The stadium was home ground for two matches for the Indian Premier League (IPL) team, Delhi Daredevils, during the 2013, 2015 and 2016 events.

The stadium hosted a half marathon, with the theme "Let Us Run" on 16 December 2012 to mark Vijay Diwas.

See also 
 Naya Raipur Development Authority
 Purkhouti Muktangan, Naya Raipur
 Atal Park

References

External links 
 
 Naya Raipur Development Authority
 Jungle Safari Zoo, Nava Raipur

Naya Raipur
Planned cities in India